Isa Pang Bahaghari is a 2019 Filipino drama film directed by Joel Lamangan and produced by Heaven's Best Entertainment and distributed by Solar Pictures, starring Nora Aunor, Phillip Salvador, Michael de Mesa, Zanjoe Marudo, Joseph Marco, Sanya Lopez, Maris Racal, Albie Casiño and Migs Almendras. The film premiered at the 2020 Metro Manila Film Festival.

Plot
The story is now more focused on the attempts of Domeng (Phillip Salvador), an erring father, to obtain the family's forgiveness especially to his wife Lumen (Nora Aunor) when he left them behind 20 years ago. They have three children: Andy (Zanjoe Marudo), a drug pusher; Peter (Joseph Marco), a waiter falsely accused of raping his girlfriend; and Dolly (Sanya Lopez), a single mom who works as a bar dancer. His wife is Nora Aunor as Lumen.

Rey ( Michael de Mesa), the mutual friend of Domeng and Lumen, who served as a bridge in their love affair as adolescents,  and now seeks to be the mediator for Domeng's reconciliation with his estranged wife and children. He is the traditional "baklang martir" who, since they were teenagers, has been in love with Domeng, continues to love him even now that they are in their 60s, and will do anything to support not just him, but Lumen as well.

Cast

Lead cast
Phillip Salvador as Domingo "Domeng / Dom" delos Reyes
Nora Aunor as Iluminada "Lumen" Sanchez-delos Santos
Michael de Mesa as Reynaldo "Rhey / Reynalda" Torrecampo
Zanjoe Marudo as Andrew "Andy" Sanchez
Joseph Marco as Peter Anthony Sanchez / Antonia Sanchez-Delos Reyes
Sanya Lopez as Dolores "Dolly / Dolly Ariana" Sanchez

Supporting cast
Jim Pebanco as Kapitan Larry
Fanny Serrano as Toots
Lloyd Samartino as Cenen
Angela Cortez as Katkat
Tabs Sumulong as Maring
Carla Humphries as Atty. Arlene Balmes
Xixi Maturan as Jojo
Shido Roxas as Edwin
Kristine Grace Loresto as Jenjen
 Juliane Earnest Costo as Popoy
 Dorothy Gilmore as Mommy Shirley
 Marie Preizer as Monica Perez
 Hero Bautista as Mr. Perez
 Christian Alano as Charles

Special participation
Albie Casiño as young Domeng
Maris Racal as young Lumen
Migs Almendras as young Rhey
Dave Bornea as young Cenen

Tirso Cruz III and Christopher de Leon were initially part of the cast but was replaced by Salvador and de Mesa.

Release
Isa Pang Bahaghari was planned to be submitted as a finished-film entry for the 2019 Metro Manila Film Festival, however the film was not among the eight official entries for that event. It was accepted as an official entry of the 2020 Metro Manila Summer Film Festival instead. However the summer film festival was cancelled due to the COVID-19 pandemic. The film was then accepted as one of the ten entries of the 2020 Metro Manila Film Festival and was released on December 25, 2020 via UpStream.

Awards and nominations

References

2020 films
2020 drama films
Films not released in theaters due to the COVID-19 pandemic
2020 LGBT-related films
Philippine LGBT-related films
Films postponed due to the COVID-19 pandemic
Films directed by Joel Lamangan